The 1907 Oregon Webfoots football team represented the University of Oregon in the 1907 college football season. It was the Webfoots' 14th season; they competed as an independent and were led by head coach Gordon B. Frost. They finished the season with a record of five wins and one loss (5–1).

Schedule

References

Oregon
Oregon Ducks football seasons
Oregon Webfoots football